Twinkle, Twinkle, Lucky Stars (released in the Philippines as Dragon Mission) is a 1985 Hong Kong action comedy film starring and directed by Sammo Hung. The film co-stars Jackie Chan and Yuen Biao. It is the third installment in the Lucky Stars series, following Winners and Sinners (1983) and My Lucky Stars (1985). Twinkle, Twinkle, Lucky Stars was released theatrically in Hong Kong on 15 August 1985.

Plot
The Five Lucky Stars, one of them being replaced by a younger brother, are assigned by the police to allow an actress to live with them. The actress has information on a crime syndicate and assassins are sent after her. Ricky and Swordflower are to stay at the actress’s home undercover to capture the assassins.  Throughout the course of the movie, the Stars chase the attractive woman around the house, though their efforts are largely unsuccessful. At the climax, the three assassins eventually end up at a recreation building to take down Swordflower (mistaking her to be their target), but coincidentally Kidstuff and his friends are there and they recognize one of them, with help from the actress.  Muscle and Ricky arrive in the nick of time and a showdown takes place, eventually ending with the protagonists victorious.  The police and a large ensemble of Chinese actors arrive to congratulate them.

Cast

Release
Twinkle, Twinkle, Lucky Stars was released in Hong Kong on 15 August 1985, and was also released in the Philippines as Dragon Mission on 6 May 1987.

Box office
The film grossed HK $28,911,851 at the Hong Kong box office.

Home media
On 30 June 2003, DVD was released by Hong Kong Legends at the United Kingdom in Region 2.

See also

Jackie Chan filmography
Andy Lau filmography
List of Hong Kong films of 1985
List of Hong Kong films
Sammo Hung filmography
Yuen Biao filmography

References

External links

 (title missing "s")

1985 films
1985 martial arts films
1980s action comedy films
1980s buddy comedy films
1980s martial arts comedy films
1980s police comedy films
1980s police procedural films
1980s Cantonese-language films
Films directed by Sammo Hung
Films set in Hong Kong
Films set in Pattaya
Golden Harvest films
Hong Kong action comedy films
Hong Kong buddy films
Hong Kong martial arts comedy films
Hong Kong police films
Police detective films
1980s Hong Kong films